Clay County is a county located in the U.S. state of Indiana. As of 2010, the population was 26,890. The county seat is Brazil.

Clay County is included in the Terre Haute, Indiana, Metropolitan Statistical Area.

History
The Indiana Legislature mandated Clay County in 1825, with territory partitioned from Owen, Putnam, Sullivan, and Vigo counties. Its name honors Henry Clay, a famous antebellum American statesman.

The first Courthouse was built in the newly platted town of Bowling Green in 1828. It was a two-story structure of hand-hewn logs.

By the late 1830s Clay County had grown to the extent that the first Courthouse could no longer provide adequate facilities. Therefore, a second Courthouse was constructed near the first Courthouse. This two-story brick structure served until destroyed by fire on November 30, 1851.

By the 1860s the towns of Harmony, Knightsville, and Brazil were growing rapidly, due in part to their location along the National Road, and also because of the many coal companies in that area. An effort to move the county seat of government to a more central location, which had begun in the 1850s, grew stronger creating controversy among citizens. In the 1860s citizens in the northern section of Clay County became more organized in their efforts. In 1871 brothers Robert and John Stewart donated land along the National Road in Brazil for a new courthouse. $5,300 was also raised by citizens in the area to entice the commissioners to move the seat of government from Bowling Green to Brazil. This amount was reportedly the value of the existing courthouse and grounds, thus defusing opponents' argument that abandoning the present courthouse would be a waste of taxpayers money. The relocation efforts, which began in 1871, were challenged in the Supreme Court. The relocation was finally granted in 1876.

In 1912 John W. Gaddis, a prominent architect in Vincennes, Indiana, entered into a contract with the County Commissioners to design, plan, and oversee the construction of a new courthouse. The construction bid of W.H. Bailey and Charles A. Koemer of Louisville, Kentucky was accepted in 1912 with the cornerstone being laid in the fall of 1912. Gaddis had completed several others: in Fairfield and Robinson, Illinois: Perryville, Missouri and two in Indiana, the Putnam County Courthouse in Greencastle (1905) and the Huntington County Courthouse (1906) in Huntington, which are also in Classical Revival mode.

The Clay County Courthouse, built in 1913–1914, is one of the most historically and architecturally significant buildings in Brazil and Clay County, Indiana. Built in Classical Revival style of architecture, it is the only building in Clay County holding county government offices and records. It is also located alongside the famed National Road (Cumberland Trail). The present building is the fifth Clay County Courthouse.

Geography

Communities

City
 Brazil

Towns

 Carbon
 Center Point
 Clay City
 Harmony
 Knightsville
 Staunton

Census-designated place
 Coalmont

Unincorporated communities

 Art
 Ashboro
 Asherville
 Barrick Corner
 Bee Ridge
 Benwood
 Billtown
 Billville
 Bogle Corner
 Bowling Green
 Brunswick
 Buchanan Corner
 Calcutta
 Cardonia
 Cherryvale
 Cloverland
 Cory
 Cottage Hill
 Donaldsonville (now part of Brazil)
 Eel River
 Hickory Island
 Hirt Corner (partial)
 Hoffman Crossing
 Hoosierville
 Howesville
 Lap Corner
 Lena (partial - known as Marysville)
 Mechanicsburg
 New Brunswick
 Old Hill
 Perth
 Poland
 Pontiac
 Prairie City
 Purdy Hill
 Roadman Corner
 Saline City
 Shady Lane
 Six Points
 Stearleyville
 Turner
 Twin Beach
 Wickville

Townships

 Brazil
 Cass
 Dick Johnson
 Harrison
 Jackson
 Lewis
 Perry
 Posey
 Sugar Ridge
 Van Buren
 Washington

Adjacent counties

 Parke County – north
 Putnam County – northeast
 Owen County – southeast
 Greene County – south
 Sullivan County – southwest
 Vigo County – west

Education
The county has two high schools: Northview High School (grades 9–12) and Clay City High School (grades 7–12). There are 7 elementary schools: Van Buren Elementary, Jackson Township Elementary, Staunton Elementary, Meridian Street Elementary, Forest Park Elementary, East Side Elementary and Clay City Elementary. The Clay Community School Corporation is located in Brazil.

Transportation

Major highways
  Interstate 70
  U.S. Route 40
  State Road 42
  State Road 46
  State Road 48
  State Road 59
  State Road 157
  State Road 159
  State Road 246
  State Road 340

Airport
The county contains one public-use airport: Brazil Clay County Airport (0I2), serving Brazil, Indiana.

Climate and weather

Government

The county government is a constitutional body, and is granted specific powers by the Constitution of Indiana, and by the Indiana Code.

County Council: The county council is the legislative branch of the county government and controls all the spending and revenue collection in the county. Representatives are elected to four-year terms from county districts. They are responsible for setting salaries, the annual budget, and special spending. The council also has limited authority to impose local taxes, in the form of an income and property tax that is subject to state level approval, excise taxes, and service taxes.

Board of Commissioners: The Board of Commissioners serves as the county's executive body. The commissioners are elected county-wide to staggered four-year terms. The Board executes acts of the County Council, collects revenue, and runs the day-to-day functions of the county government.

Court: The county maintains a small claims court that can handle some civil cases. The judge on the court is elected to a term of four years and must be a member of the Indiana Bar Association. The judge is assisted by a constable who is also elected to a four-year term. In some cases, court decisions can be appealed to the state-level circuit court.

County Officials: The county has several other elected offices, including sheriff, coroner, auditor, treasurer, recorder, surveyor, and circuit court clerk. Each of these elected officers serves a term of four years and oversees a different part of county government. Members elected to county government positions are required to declare a party affiliation and to be residents of the county.

Clay County is part of Indiana's 8th congressional district; Indiana Senate districts 38 and 39; and Indiana House of Representatives districts 42, 44 and 46.

Clay County tends to vote Republican. Since 1888, county voters have chosen the Republican Party nominee in 73% (24 of 34) of the elections through 2020.

Demographics

As of the 2010 United States Census, there were 26,890 people, 10,447 households, and 7,454 families in the county. The racial makeup of the county was 97.8% white, 0.3% black or African American, 0.2% Asian, 0.2% American Indian, 0.5% from other races, and 0.9% from two or more races. Those of Hispanic or Latino origin made up 1.1% of the population. In terms of ancestry, 29.2% were German, 20.2% were American, 12.8% were Irish, and 11.0% were English.

Of the 10,447 households, 33.4% had children under the age of 18 living with them, 55.9% were married couples living together, 10.7% had a female householder with no husband present, 28.6% were non-families, and 24.0% of all households were made up of individuals. The average household size was 2.54 and the average family size was 2.99. The median age was 39.9 years.

The median income for a household in the county was $47,697 and the median income for a family was $52,907. Males had a median income of $40,671 versus $31,331 for females. The per capita income for the county was $20,569. About 9.0% of families and 12.5% of the population were below the poverty line, including 21.9% of those under age 18 and 6.7% of those age 65 or over.

2020 census

See also
 National Register of Historic Places listings in Clay County, Indiana

References
Specific

General

 Clay County Interim Report by Historic Landmarks Foundation of Indiana

External links
 Clay County Official Website

 
Indiana counties
1825 establishments in Indiana
Populated places established in 1825
National Road
Terre Haute metropolitan area